Desperate Teenage Lovedolls: Original Motion Picture Soundtrack is an album of music from the film Desperate Teenage Lovedolls. The soundtrack was originally released on Gasatanka Records in 1984, re-issued by SST Records in 1987 and re-released again in an expanded edition on CD by Sympathy For The Record Industry in 1997.

Track listing of the 1997 CD Reissue
 Redd Kross - "Ballad of a Lovedoll" - 1:49
 Redd Kross - "Legend (Come On Up to Me)" - 2:48
 Nip Drivers - "Fox on the Run" - 2:33
 Redd Kross - "Out of Focus" - 3:19
 Black Flag - "Life of Pain" - 2:55
 Red Kross - "Self Respect" - 0:48
 Greg Graffin & Greg Hetson - "Running Fast" - 3:23
 White Flag - "Johnny Tremaine's Theme" - 2:30
 SIN 34 - "12 Hour Trip" - 2:23
 Bags - "Survive" - 2:56
 Redd Kross - "Charlie" - 1:51
 Redd Kross - "Stairway to Heaven" - 2:56
 Redd Kross - "Purple Haze" - 2:54
 Darkside - "Right's Right" - 2:32
 White Flag - "You Got Me" - 2:54
 White Flag - "Hot Bitch (With an Electric Guitar)" - 2:54
 Redd Kross - "Ballad of a Lovedoll" - 2:22
 Desperate Teenage Lovedolls - "Desperate Teenage Lovedolls Radio Spot/Dave Markey" - 1:02
 Desperate Teenage Lovedolls - "Interview With Jeff & Steve McDonald (with Edith Massey & Stella)" - 5:52

References
 [ Review and synopsis at All Music]
'Legend (Come On Up To Me)' was written and sung by Joanna Spock Dean, listed on the album as Joanna Spockolla McDonald, the bass player for the L.A. punk band Backstage Pass, who also sang on 'You Got Me' and 'Hot Bitch With An Electric Guitar'.

See also
 Desperate Teenage Lovedolls (film)
 Lovedolls Superstar (film)
 Lovedolls Superstar (soundtrack)

1984 soundtrack albums
Film soundtracks
SST Records soundtracks
Sympathy for the Record Industry soundtracks